David Christopher Garnett (born 26 September 1945) was Archdeacon of Chesterfield (and a canon of Derby Cathedral from 1996 until 2009.
He was educated at Giggleswick School, Fitzwilliam College, Cambridge, and Westcott House, Cambridge, and ordained in 1970. After a curacy in Cottingham he was chaplain, fellow and tutor of Selwyn College, Cambridge. He held incumbencies  in  Patterdale, Heald Green, Christleton and  Ellesmere Port before his time as archdeacon, and Edensor afterwards.

Notes

1945 births
People educated at Giggleswick School
Alumni of Fitzwilliam College, Cambridge
Alumni of Westcott House, Cambridge
Fellows of Selwyn College, Cambridge
Archdeacons of Chesterfield
Living people